is a Japanese footballer currently studying at the Waseda University.

Career statistics

Club
.

Notes

References

External links

2002 births
Living people
Waseda University alumni
Japanese footballers
Japanese expatriate footballers
Association football midfielders
J3 League players
Gamba Osaka players
Gamba Osaka U-23 players
Japanese expatriate sportspeople in the United States
Expatriate soccer players in the United States